Voula Damianakou (1914–2016) was a Greek author, translator and a member of the Greek resistance against Nazi Germany.

Biography 
Voula Damianakou was born in Panitsa, Laconia in 1914. She was a supporter of women's political rights and collaborated with Vassilis Rotas in the translations of Shakespeare plays and with whom she published the magazine Laikos Logos between 1965 and 1967. In January 1999, she received Abdullah Öcalan in her house upon the request of the retired Greek Admiral Antoni Naxakis. The visit of Öcalan inspired her to write a book. She died on the 19 September 2016 in Athens and was buried in Myrsini.

Personal life 
She was married to Vassili Rotas the Minister of Culture of the Political Committee of National Liberation (PEEA), the political movement against the Axis powers during World War II. Her daughter is the painter Eleni Vassilopoulou.

Works 
She published several books and was involved heavily in the translation of William Shakespeare plays. She became known for portraying the classic comic playwright Aristophanes as a sympathizer of leftwing politics dubbing him Aristerophanes in her play Avgi.

References 

1914 births
2016 deaths
Greek writers
Greek Resistance members
People from East Mani
Greek centenarians
Women centenarians